George Ikenne (born 29 October 1991) is a Nigerian former football player.

Club career
On 6 January 2022, Ikenne joined Mezőkövesd.

Club statistics

Updated to games played as of 15 May 2021.

References

External links
HLSZ

1991 births
Living people
People from Calabar
Nigerian footballers
Association football midfielders
Budapest Honvéd FC players
MTK Budapest FC players
Mezőkövesdi SE footballers
Nemzeti Bajnokság I players
Nemzeti Bajnokság II players
Nigerian expatriate footballers
Expatriate footballers in Hungary
Nigerian expatriate sportspeople in Hungary